Havering Country Park is a varied environment open space in the London Borough of Havering. It includes  of woodland.

It is one of three large parklands in Havering-atte-Bower, the others are Bedfords Park and Pyrgo Park.

The area of the park was formerly part of the estate of Havering Palace.

The land was purchased by the Greater London Council and opened to the public in 1975, with ownership transferring to Havering Council in 1986.

External links
Havering London Borough Council: Havering Country Park

Parks and open spaces in the London Borough of Havering
Forests and woodlands of London
Country parks in London